Susan or Sue Grey or Gray may refer to:

Susan Grey, Countess of Kent (born 1554), English aristocrat
Susan McGreivy (née Gray; born 1939), American swimmer and activist
Sue Gray (civil servant) (born 1957), British civil servant
Dame Sue Gray (RAF officer) (born 1963), British air marshal
Sue Grey (lawyer) (born 1962/63), New Zealand environmental lawyer and anti-vaccination campaigner
Susan Grey, fictional character in Grey's Anatomy

See also
Suzanne Gray, British meteorologist